Hamad bin Abdulaziz Al Suwailem is Secretary General of the Royal Court of Saudi Arabia. Previously he had been Deputy Chief of the Crown Prince's Court, under then-Prince Salman and his son Mohammed, and then the Chief of the Crown Prince's Court for Prince Muqrin at the rank of the minister.

References

Living people
Government ministers of Saudi Arabia
Year of birth missing (living people)